Statistics of the Scottish Football League in season 1946–47.

Scottish League Division A

Scottish League Division B

Scottish League Division C

See also
1946–47 in Scottish football

References

 
Scottish Football League seasons